Midway is an unincorporated community in Dyer County, Tennessee, United States.

References

Unincorporated communities in Dyer County, Tennessee
Unincorporated communities in Tennessee